Adriano Pereira da Silva, known as Adriano (born 3 April 1982 in Salvador, Bahia) is a Brazilian football defender. He most recently played for Monaco.

Career

Club
He was signed by Palermo from Grêmio in summer 2004, but just played one league match. 50% of Adriano's registration rights was sold to Atalanta in summer 2005 after a successful 6 months loan. Along with Igor Budan they costed Atalanta €1.5 million as part of Stephen Makinwa's deal. Adriano was valued €500,000 at that time.

Atalanta bought all the rights on 1 June 2007, but sold him to AS Monaco FC on last day of the transfer window. On 12 July 2013, Monaco announced that Adriano had left the club after six years.

Career statistics

Club

References

External links

 
 
 

1982 births
Living people
Brazilian footballers
Brazil under-20 international footballers
Brazilian expatriate footballers
Association football defenders
Grêmio Foot-Ball Porto Alegrense players
Palermo F.C. players
Atalanta B.C. players
AS Monaco FC players
Expatriate footballers in Italy
Expatriate footballers in Monaco
Serie A players
Serie B players
Ligue 1 players
Ligue 2 players
Sportspeople from Salvador, Bahia